Eukaryotic translation initiation factor 1A, X-chromosomal (eIF1A) is a protein that in humans is encoded by the EIF1AX gene. This gene encodes an essential eukaryotic translation initiation factor. The protein is a component of the 43S pre-initiation complex (PIC), which mediates the recruitment of the small 40S ribosomal subunit to the 5' cap of messenger RNAs.

Function 
eIF1A is a small protein (17 kDa in budding yeast) and a component of the 43S preinitiation complexes (PIC). eIF1A binds near the ribosomal A-site, in a manner similar to the functionally related bacterial counterpart IF1.

Clinical significance 

Mutations in this gene have been recurrently seen associated to cases of uveal melanoma with disomy 3. eIF1A is mutated in thyroid cancers.

Interactions 

EIF1AX has been shown to interact with IPO13.

See also
 Eukaryotic initiation factors

References

Further reading

External links